Čop Street is a major pedestrian thoroughfare in the center of Ljubljana, Slovenia and regarded as the capital's central promenade.

Location
The street leads from the Main Post Office at Slovene Street to Prešeren Square.

History
Until the late 19th century, the street was known as Elephant Street in memory of an elephant present in the city in the 16th century. A gift from the Ottoman sultan, the animal had been traveling in the entourage of Emperor Maximilian II on his way back from Spain to Germany, and had been stabled at what is now the upper part of the street in 1550, where the Slon Hotel now stands.

In 1892, the name of the street was changed to Prešeren Street. In 1949, it was renamed Čop Street after Matija Čop, an early 19th-century literary figure and close friend of the Slovene Romantic poet France Prešeren.

References

External links

Streets in Ljubljana
Shopping districts and streets
Pedestrian malls
Center District, Ljubljana